Haplochromis taurinus is a species of cichlid found in the Democratic Republic of the Congo and Uganda where it occurs in Lake George, Lake Edward and the Kazinga Channel.  This species reaches a length of  SL.

References

taurinus
Fish described in 1933
Taxonomy articles created by Polbot